The Eldon Law Scholarship is a scholarship awarded to students from the University of Oxford who wish to study for the English Bar. Applicants must either have obtained a first class honours degree in the Final Honours School, or obtained a distinction on the BCL or MJur. It is a two-year scholarship presently funded at £9,000 a year.

History

The scholarship dates from 12 May 1830, and was funded in response to an application from subscribers. Although the scholarship is named after Lord Eldon LC, it is not funded from his will – Lord Eldon did not in fact die until eight years after the scholarship was founded. The first trustees included the Duke of Richmond, Earl of Mansfield, Earl of Romney and Lord Arden.

Until 1963 it was a requirement that an applicant be a member of the Church of England. In 1963 that was downgraded to a preference, and in 1983 the requirement was dropped entirely.

Past winners
Past winners include:
 Sir Robert Herbert, first Premier of Queensland, Australia
 John Conington, classical scholar (who gave up the scholarship)
 Ralph Lingen, 1st Baron Lingen, civil servant.
 Alfred Hazel 
 Thomas Henry Haddan, founder of The Guardian
 Alfred Barratt, philosopher
 Murray Coutts-Trotter, Chief Justice of Madras High Court
 Sir Frederick Lidell, civil servant.
Raymond Asquith (1902)
Lord Asquith of Bishopstone, Law Lord
 Professor Sir Carleton Allen (1913)
 Gordon Alchin (1920), poet.
 Lord Denning (1921), Law Lord and Master of the Rolls
 Lord Radcliffe (1923), Law Lord
 Lord Wilberforce (1930), Law Lord.
 John Morris (1933), academic
 Sir James Fawcett (1935), President of the European Commission for Human Rights
 Sir Wilfrid Bourne (1948), Permanent Secretary to the Lord Chancellor's Office
 Sir Richard Blackburn (1949), Australian judge
 Sir Christopher Slade (1950), Lord Justice of Appeal.
 Ted Nugee, QC (1953)
 Lord Bingham (1957), Law Lord and Master of the Rolls
 Sir James Munby (1970), President of the Family Division.
 Dame Sonia Proudman (1973), High Court judge.
 Sir Stephen Tomlinson (1974), Lord Justice of Appeal
 Gabriel Moss QC (1975), barrister.
 Nicholas Hamblen (1982), Justice of the UK Supreme Court
 Sir Christopher Nugee (1984), High Court judge.
 Lord Sales, Philip Sales (1986) Justice of the UK Supreme Court.
 Sir Christopher Butcher (1987), High Court judge. 
 Sir David Foxton (1989), High Court judge.
 Dame Sara Cockerill (1990), High Court judge and Judge in Charge of the Commercial Court.
 Sir Martin Chamberlain (1997), High Court judge.

References

Awards and prizes of the University of Oxford
Awards established in 1830
Scholarships in the United Kingdom